Atmakur(M) is a Mandal in Yadadri Bhuvanagiri district of the Indian state of Telangana. It is located in Bhongir revenue division.

Governance 

Atmakur gram panchayat is the local self-government of the village.

References 

 Villages in Yadadri Bhuvanagiri district
 Mandal headquarters in Yadadri Bhuvanagiri district